The Free Officers were a group of revolutionary Egyptian nationalist officers in the Egyptian Armed Forces and Sudanese Armed Forces that instigated the Egyptian Revolution of 1952. Initially started as a small rebellion military cell under Abdel Moneim Abdel Raouf, which included Gamal Abdel Nasser, Hussein Hamouda, Khaled Mohieddin, Kamal el-Din Hussein, Salah Nasr, Abdel Hakim Amer, and Saad Tawfik, it operated as a clandestine movement of junior officers during the Palestine War of 1948-1949. The nationally respected war hero Mohamed Naguib joined the Free Officers in 1949. Naguib's hero status, and influence within the army, granted the movement credibility, both within the military and the public at large. He became the official leader of the Free Officers during the turmoil leading up the revolution that toppled King Farouk in 1952.

Background  

Economic challenges that emerged following the First World War, namely the Great Depression, affected national economies around the globe, including those of Egypt and Sudan. During this time, the Great Powers in the Arab World and Middle East began removing institutions for economic development after some positive advancement became evident. This encouraged many political groups to organize against the politicians who dominated the parliamentary politics of the time. Workers had become accustomed to development efforts which were meant to stabilize the economies of the region. These state-led initiatives set the standard for what the people expected of their government, including the regulation of imports, industrial investment, commodity distribution, production supervision.

Formation
Politicians and government bodies were forced to respond to the demands of groups who were directly affected by the initiative changes and withdrawals. Some of these groups included military officers. While the first military coups began in Syria in the late 1940s, it was the Free Officers coup in Egypt and the revolution of 1952 that would have the greatest impact, and encourage later movements. The members were not from the wealthy elite, but rather the middle class, young workers, government officials and junior officers. The movement, which began and spread throughout the 1940s, came to fruition with the leadership of Gamal Abdel Nasser. Nasser, who commanded the loyalty and respect of the other members, formed a coordinating committee (1949), which he was later asked to lead (1950). Coming from a modest background, he represented the group's majority: the hard-working middle class. The Free Officers consisted of urban dwellers and educated militants with a lower-middle-class upbringing. Nasser was a war hero who rose quickly in military rank to colonel. He, like many others, dedicated his time and energy to reversing the corruption seen on the part of the government throughout the 1947–1949 Palestine war by restoring a democracy. He saw the problem of domestic passivity towards imperialism as being as much a problem as imperialism itself. The Free Officers strengthened a "new" middle class. Due to this dedication to change, the Free Officers referred to their group and its entirety as simply a "movement." Later however, it would become a revolution.

The Free Officers Committee enlisted General Muhammad Naguib as a public figurehead in preparation for the successful coup of 23 July 1952. The men who had constituted themselves as the Committee of the Free Officers Movement and led the 1952 Revolution were Lieutenant Colonel Gamal Abdel Nasser (1917–70), Major Abdel Hakim Amer (1919–67), Lieutenant Colonel Anwar El-Sadat (1918–81), Major Salah Salem (1920–62), Major Kamal el-Din Hussein (1921–99), Wing Commander Gamal Salem (1918–2001), Squadron Leader Hassan Ibrahim (1917–90), Major Khalid Mohieddin (1922–2018), and Wing Commander Abdel Latif Boghdadi (1917–99); Major Hussein el-Shafei (1918–2005) and Lieutenant Colonel Zakaria Mohieddin (1918–2012) joined the committee later.

The continued agitation within Egypt as a result of British control led to a series of revolts in which British military outposts were attacked. During 1950–52, workers in the Suez Canal Zone went on strike but were blockaded by the British Army. The pro-British Egyptian government in Cairo issued a public warning to Egyptian nationalists not to continue their activities. Contrarily, attacks were made against the British and the Egyptian elites who worked with them. At this point, Egyptian nationalist groups were divided and disorganised. The military was the only area that still held some sort of organised mission, which led to the Revolution of 1952. The revolutionaries publicised the need for reform and social justice, marched on Cairo and forced King Farouk to abdicate his throne. The revolution led to the end of British control over Egypt, which had begun in 1882 during the Anglo-Egyptian War.

Legacy
Similar movements were organised by other groups of junior officers seeking to mimic the Free Officers' ascent to power. In Iraq, a faction of Arab and Iraqi nationalist officers, who referred to themselves as the "Free Officers", toppled the pro-British Hashemite government of Nuri al-Said and Faisal II in 1958. Said and Faisal, Nasser's chief regional rivals at the time, were both killed during the coup. In 1963 some of the same officers aligned themselves with the Ba'ath Party and overthrew the government of Abd al-Karim Qasim, who was killed by the organizers of the coup.

In Syria a coalition of Arab nationalist officers, including Nasserists, Ba'athists and independents, toppled the secessionist government of Nazim al-Qudsi in 1963 and vowed to restore the union with Egypt in the United Arab Republic (1958–1961). In Saudi Arabia during the 1960s the Prince Talal invoked a similar idea, the Free Princes Movement, in an unsuccessful effort to overthrow his country's conservative monarchy. He was exiled to Egypt as a result and was given asylum by Nasser.

Then Libyan leader Muammar al-Gaddafi used a similar group to overthrow the Libyan King Idris in 1969.

The anniversary of the Egyptian Revolution of 1952 led by the Free Officers is commemorated as Revolution Day, an annual public holiday in Egypt on 23 July.

The name was consciously assumed by the Free Officers and Civilians Movement, led by Brigadier-General Najib al-Salihi who opposed Saddam Hussein.

Members
This is a list of some of the major officers of the movement:
 Major General Muhammad Naguib (Border Guards)
 Brigadier General Youssef Seddik (Infantry)
 Lieutenant Colonel Gamal Abdel Nasser (Infantry)
 Lieutenant Colonel Anwar El-Sadat (Military Communication)
 Lieutenant Colonel Zakaria Mohieddin (Infantry)
 Major Abdel Hakim Amer (Infantry)
 Major Salah Salem (Artillery)
 Major Kamal el-Din Hussein (Artillery)
 Major Khalid Mohieddin (Armoured Corps)
 Major Hussein Al Shafei (Armoured Corps)
 General Ali Elbana  
 Major Hamdy Ebeid
 Captain Abdel Moneim Abdel Raouf (Air force)
 Wing Commander Gamal Salem (Air force)
 Wing Commander Abd al-Latif al-Boghdadi (Air force)
 Squadron Leader Hassan Ibrahim (Air force)
 Amin Shaker (Military Communication)
 Mashhour Ahmed Mashhour
 Aly Mansour (Air Force)
 Mounier Shash (Artillery)
 Major General Mohamed Uthman (Infantry)

See also
 Egyptian Revolution of 1952
 Egyptian Revolutionary Command Council
 History of Modern Egypt

References

External links
Armed Conflicts events Data: Egypt Coup 1952 

Egyptian nationalists
Egyptian revolutionaries
Military history of Egypt
 
Rebel groups in Egypt
Revolutions in Egypt
Egyptian Revolution of 1952